Edward Oliver Shaw (20 January 1920  31 July 1944) was a Marine Corps flying ace during World War II, credited with taking out 13 enemy aircraft. He was awarded the Distinguished Flying Cross and reached the rank of captain before he was killed during a test flight in California.

Education 

Shaw graduated from West Valley High School, and then attended Washington State college for one year.

Aerial combat missions  
During a combat sortie in 1943 Shaw was engaged by Zeros while protecting friendly dive bombers. Shaw shot down one enemy plane and also managed to destroy two float planes before the mission was over. For this and other actions he was awarded the Distinguished Flying Cross and was publicly lauded for his combat missions in the Pacific. On another combat sortie the same year, he and his flight intercepted eight enemy bombers, and he shot down two of them, as well as claiming a third by working together with another pilot.

References 

1920 births
1944 deaths
American World War II flying aces
Recipients of the Distinguished Flying Cross (United States)
United States Marine Corps pilots of World War II
United States Marine Corps personnel killed in World War II
Aviators killed in aviation accidents or incidents in the United States